Monkman & Seagull's Genius Guide to Britain is a BBC documentary series presented by Eric Monkman and Bobby Seagull, a duo who met as rivals on the quiz programme University Challenge and became friends, coauthors and radio-show co-hosts. The show is a road trip around the United Kingdom and focuses on British scientific and technological ingenuity and has a voiceover supplied by Simon Callow.

The show aired in September and October 2018 and was recommissioned for a second series which became a new series Monkman & Seagull’s Genius Adventures, which was broadcast in three 60 minute episodes in May 2020.

Episodes

Reception
Sarah Hughes in i called the series "entertaining, eccentric, and well-informed" and praised the pair's unforced eccentricity and natural rapport.

Rebecca Nicholson in The Guardian also praised the warmth and appeal of their friendship but said that the show felt a bit "skittish" by not staying at locations for long enough.

In The Evening Standard, Katie Law said there was insufficient chemistry between them and that none of their observations is especially nuanced or perceptive.

Notes

References

External links

2018 British television series debuts
2018 British television series endings
BBC television documentaries about science
Documentary television series about technology
Industrial history of the United Kingdom
Works about the history of industries